Namibia, a country in south-western Africa, has a total of 124 known caves, 41 of which are situated in the Otjozondjupa Region.

In several  of these caves research has been done and published in various journals, but of a variety of caves the location is not commonly known, as the information got lost over the years. Some locations are also deliberately kept secret to protect the caves.

History
The caves known to local people were reported by early explorers and travelers. The caves of Namibia are not reported for their beauty, but for their practical and curiosity reasons.

A very common belief is that caves were used as shelter places by the San people (Bushmen). However, San did not use caves to shelter in, as most caves of Namibia have vertical entrances and also are situated on top of elevations. Caves were only used when they were accessible and allowed observation over approaching and surrounding area and also room was provided at entrance to shelter. Resources like water, bird’s eggs and honey were indeed used by the local people.

Throughout 1882 to 1915, the Imperial German colonial administration troops were interested in caves, as they provided in remote areas water supply for transport animals. Cave pools which were accessible were used as water points for police patrols and resistance fighters alike.

As years passed, landowners became interested in caves, as due to WW1 and WW2 nitrate was regarded a strategic resource and could no longer be used in fertilizers. Nitrate minerals were replaced by bird guano, but only a small quantity was used locally, the rest was exported. As no fertilizer was available, farmers searched caves and used bat guano as alternative. In the period of 1935 to 1942 more than 10 000 tons of bat guano was extracted from Arnhem cave, but also smaller caves like Nooitgedacht, Otgrot, Valle and others, were mined.

From 1963 research was done on various caves all over Namibia. It was done by local people, but also a variety of researchers from Australia, Austria, France, Germany and many more countries. A problem with researchers from other countries is that they do not ensure that their results and reports are available in Namibia and so valuable information is then lost.

Notable caves
 
 Dragon's Breath Cave: The cave was first discovered and entered by Roger Ellis of the South African Spelaeological Association in 1986 during an expedition to discover new caves in the Otavi/Grootfontein/Tsumeb area. Researcher John Irish, an entomologist at the National Museum of Namibia and Dr. Jacques Martini of the South African Geological Survey Department conducted speleological research on the geology and fauna of the cave. In 1987  a cave diving expedition was led by Roger Ellis and Charles Maxwell to explore the underwater extent of the cave. Dragon's Breath Cave was subsequently surveyed and listed in the Guinness World Records book as the largest non-subglacial underground lake in the world.
 Caves beneath Otjikoto Lake and Lake Guinas: Both of these lakes were created by collapsing dolomite caves, and are submerged in water.
This cave contained some of the oldest pieces of mobile art ever discovered in southern Africa, radiocarbon dated from 27,500 to 25,500 BP.
 Aigamas Cave in the Otjozondjupa region harbours the only known mainland population of a cavefish (Clarias cavernicola) in Southern Africa.
 the Ghaub Caves in southern Oshikoto Region in the centre of the Otavi Triangle (Tsumeb – Otavi – Grootfontein) have been declared a national monument in 1967, the only caves in Namibia with that status

References

 
Geology of Namibia